Tana Sripandorn (born August 15, 1986) is a professional footballer from Thailand who plays as defender for Phitsanulok.

Honour 
 Lamphun Warriors
 Thai League 2 (1): 2021–22
 Thai League 3 (1): 2020–21

Phitsanulok
 Thai League 3 Northern Region: 2022–23

External links
Profile at Thaipremierleague.co.th

1986 births
Living people
Tana Sripandorn
Tana Sripandorn
Association football defenders
Tana Sripandorn
Tana Sripandorn
Tana Sripandorn
Tana Sripandorn
Tana Sripandorn
Tana Sripandorn